First Night is a 1937 British drama film directed by Donovan Pedelty and starring Jack Livesey, Rani Waller and Sunday Wilshin. It was made at Wembley Studios as a quota quickie.

Cast
 Jack Livesey as Richard Garnet  
 Rani Waller as Judith Armstrong  
 Sunday Wilshin as Rosalind Faber  
 Ernest Mainwaring as Henry Armstrong  
 Margaret Damer as Elaine Armstrong  
 Ann Wilton as Ivy  
 Felix Erwin as Patterson Luke 
 Bill Shine (actor)

References

Bibliography
 Chibnall, Steve. Quota Quickies: The Birth of the British 'B' Film. British Film Institute, 2007.
 Low, Rachael. Filmmaking in 1930s Britain. George Allen & Unwin, 1985.
 Wood, Linda. British Films, 1927-1939. British Film Institute, 1986.

External links

1937 films
British drama films
1937 drama films
Films directed by Donovan Pedelty
Quota quickies
Films shot at Wembley Studios
British black-and-white films
1930s English-language films
1930s British films